Brandon Winn Sanderson (born December 19, 1975) is an American author of high fantasy and science fiction. He is best known for the Cosmere fictional universe, in which most of his fantasy novels, most notably the Mistborn series and The Stormlight Archive, are set. Outside of the Cosmere, he has written several young adult and juvenile series including The Reckoners, the Skyward series, and the Alcatraz series. He is also known for finishing Robert Jordan's high fantasy series The Wheel of Time. Sanderson has created several graphic novel fantasy series, including White Sand and Dark One.

He created Sanderson's Laws of Magic and popularized the idea of "hard magic" and "soft magic" systems. In 2008, Sanderson started a podcast with author Dan Wells and cartoonist Howard Tayler called Writing Excuses, involving topics about creating genre writing and webcomics. In 2016, the American media company DMG Entertainment licensed the movie rights to Sanderson's entire Cosmere universe, but the rights have since reverted back to Sanderson. Sanderson's March 2022 Kickstarter campaign became the most successful in history, finishing with 185,341 backers pledging $41,754,153.

Personal life

Early life and education
Brandon Sanderson was born on December 19, 1975, in Lincoln, Nebraska,  the eldest of four children. Sanderson became a passionate reader of high fantasy novels while a teenager, and he made several early attempts at writing his own stories. After graduating from high school in 1994, he went to Brigham Young University (BYU) as a biochemistry major.  He took a two-year leave of absence from 1995 to 1997 to serve as a volunteer missionary for the Church of Jesus Christ of Latter-day Saints and was assigned to serve in South Korea.

After completing his missionary service, Sanderson returned to BYU and changed his major to English literature. While an undergraduate, Sanderson took a job as a night auditor at a local hotel in Provo, Utah, as it allowed him to write while working. One of Sanderson's roommates at BYU was Ken Jennings, who nearly ten years later became famous during his 74-game win streak on the American game show Jeopardy!. Sanderson graduated from BYU in 2000 with a Bachelor of Arts. He continued on as a graduate student, receiving an M.A. in English with an emphasis in creative writing in 2004. While at BYU, Sanderson was on the staff of Leading Edge, a semi-professional speculative fiction magazine published by the university, and served as its editor-in-chief for one year.

In 2006, Sanderson married Emily Bushman, an English, Spanish, and ESL teacher and fellow BYU alumna who later became his business manager. They have three sons and reside in American Fork, Utah.

Career

Early writing career

Sanderson wrote consistently throughout his undergraduate and graduate studies, and by 2003 he had written twelve novels, though no publisher had accepted any of them for publication. While in the middle of a graduate program at BYU, he was contacted by Tor Books editor Moshe Feder, who wanted to acquire one of his books. Sanderson had submitted the manuscript of his sixth novel, Elantris, a year and a half earlier. Elantris was published by Tor Books on April 21, 2005, to generally positive reviews. This was followed in 2006 by Mistborn: The Final Empire, the first book in his Mistborn fantasy trilogy, in which "allomancers"—people with the ability to 'burn' metals and alloys after ingesting them—gain enhanced senses and control over powerful supernatural forces.

He published the second book of the Mistborn series The Well of Ascension in 2007. Later that year, Sanderson published the children's novel Alcatraz Versus the Evil Librarians, about a boy named Alcatraz with a talent for breaking things. Alcatraz confronts a group of evil librarians who are bent on taking over the world. The first of his "laws of magic" were first published in 2007, with the second and third published in 2012 and 2013 (respectively). In 2008, the third and final book in the Mistborn trilogy was published, titled The Hero of Ages, as well as the second book in the Alcatraz series, titled Alcatraz Versus the Scrivener's Bones. That same year, he started the podcast Writing Excuses with Howard Tayler and Dan Wells.

The Wheel of Time
Sanderson rose to prominence in late 2007 when Harriet McDougal, the wife and editor of author Robert Jordan, chose Sanderson to complete the final books in Jordan's epic fantasy series The Wheel of Time after Jordan's death. McDougal asked Sanderson to finish the series after being deeply impressed by his first Mistborn novel, The Final Empire. Tor Books made the announcement on December 7, 2007. After reviewing what was necessary to complete the series, Sanderson and Tor announced on March 30, 2009, that a final three books would be published instead of just one. 

The first of these, The Gathering Storm, was published on October 27, 2009, and reached the number-one spot on the New York Times bestseller list for hardcover fiction. Towers of Midnight, the second-to-last Wheel of Time book, was published just over a year after The Gathering Storm on November 2, 2010, debuting at number one on the bestseller list. In early 2013, the series was completed with the publication of A Memory of Light.

Career

In 2009, Tor Books published Warbreaker, which originally appeared serially on Sanderson's website while he was writing the novel from 2006 to 2009. In the same year, the third Alcatraz book was published, titled Alcatraz Versus the Knights of Crystallia. In 2010, Sanderson published The Way of Kings, the first of a planned ten-book series called The Stormlight Archive. It achieved the number seven slot on the New York Times hardcover fiction bestseller list. The fourth Alcatraz novel, Alcatraz Versus the Shattered Lens, followed soon after.

In October 2011, he finished a novella e-book, Infinity Blade: Awakening, based on the action role-playing, iOS video game Infinity Blade, developed by Chair Entertainment and Epic Games. In November 2011, he published a sequel to the Mistborn trilogy, Mistborn: The Alloy of Law. It was originally planned as a standalone novel set about 300 years after the original trilogy, but it was later expanded into a four-book series. It debuted at number nine on the combined print and e-book New York Times Best Seller list.

On August 31, 2012, Sanderson published a science fiction novella entitled Legion, followed by another short work titled The Emperor's Soul. In 2013, Sanderson published two new young adult series. These series included The Rithmatist and the first of The Reckoners series titled Steelheart. In March 2014, Words of Radiance, the second book in The Stormlight Archive, was published.

Later that year, Subterranean Press published the second novella in the Legion series, Legion: Skin Deep. It was a preliminary nominee for the 2015 Hugo Awards, but did not make the final ballot. In January 2015, the second book of The Reckoners, titled Firefight, was published. Firefight won the 2015 Whitney Award in the Best Young Adult—Speculative category. It also placed eighth in the Young Adult Fantasy & Science Fiction category of the Goodreads Choice Awards and was a finalist for the 2015 AML Award in the Young Adult Novel category.

Nine months later, Sanderson published Mistborn: Shadows of Self as a direct sequel to The Alloy of Law. The novel won the 2017 Neffy Award in the Best Novel category, placed third in the 2015 Goodreads Choice Awards in the Fantasy category, was a finalist in the Best Speculative Fiction category of the 2015 Whitney Awards, and was a preliminary nomineed for the 2016 Gemmell Legend Award. On November 16, 2015, Sanderson's agency (JABberwocky Literary Agency) announced that Sanderson officially sold over 7 million copies worldwide. 

On January 26, 2016, Mistborn: The Bands of Mourning was published as the sequel to Shadows of Self. On February 16, 2016, the third and final book of the Reckoners trilogy, titled Calamity, was published. In June 2016, Sanderson's first graphic novel White Sand—written with Rik Hoskin—was released. The series is planned as a trilogy. The graphic novels are based on an original manuscript by Sanderson. On September 6, 2016, the fifth Alcatraz book was published, called Alcatraz Versus the Dark Talent.

DMG Entertainment optioned the Cosmere in 2016 for film and television. On November 22, 2016, an anthology of Cosmere short stories and novellas was published, titled Arcanum Unbounded: A Cosmere Collection. The third book in The Stormlight Archive, Oathbringer, was published on November 14, 2017. The first book of the Defiant series, Skyward, was published on November 6, 2018. The second book in the series, Starsight, was released on November 26, 2019. In September 2020, a collaboration project with author Mary Robinette Kowal called The Original, was released. Rhythm of War, the fourth Stormlight novel, was published on November 17, 2020. In 2020, Sanderson's agency updated his number of copies sold to over 18 million worldwide, and in early 2021, to over 21 million.

In March 2021, Brandon Sanderson announced a "Weekly Update" in his YouTube channel which will give updates on his current projects every week. On May 26, Brandon Sanderson revealed the title and cover for "Cytonic", the third book of his Skyward series, which was published on November 23, 2021. Sanderson started a new podcast in June 2021 called 'Intentionally Blank', with friend and fellow science fiction author Dan Wells. 

Sanderson announced in March 2022 that, over the previous two pandemic years, he had secretly written five otherwise-unannounced books (four full adult novels and a shorter junior novel). The full novels (three of which are set in the Cosmere) will be made available through a Kickstarter subscription that will release them quarterly through 2023. The Kickstarter campaign was highly successful, raising $15 million in its first 24 hours and over $20 million within three days, becoming the all-time most successful campaign. The Kickstarter campaign finished with 185,341 backers pledging $41,754,153. Before the conclusion of his Kickstarter campaign, Sanderson also backed every other publishing project on Kickstarter, for a total of 316 projects. One of the secret projects during the pandemic, Tress of the Emerald Sea, will be available in book form in April 2023.

Sanderson also collaborated with Unknown Worlds Entertainment to create the lore and setting for the video game Moonbreaker, which was released via early access in September 2022.

Cosmere
The Cosmere is the name of the universe in which Elantris, Mistborn, Warbreaker, The Stormlight Archive, White Sand, Tress of the Emerald Sea, and stories contained in Arcanum Unbounded: The Cosmere Collection are all set. This idea came from Sanderson's desire to create an epic-length series without requiring readers to buy a ridiculous number of books. Because of that, he hides connections to his other works within each book, creating a "hidden epic". He has estimated that the Cosmere sequence could conclude with at least 40 books.

The story of the Cosmere is about a mysterious being called Adonalsium, who existed on a world known as Yolen. Adonalsium was killed by a group of at least eighteen conspirators, causing its power to shatter into sixteen different Shards, each of which bears immense power. Sixteen of those people then took these Shards and traveled to new worlds, populating them with different systems of magic. In one case, the Shards Ruin and Preservation worked together to actually create a planet and its people (Scadrial, as featured in Mistborn).

Each Shard has an Intent, such as Ambition or Honor, and a Vessel's personality is changed over time to bring them more in-line with their Intent. Odium has killedor Splinteredseveral shards. On Sel, he splintered Devotion and Dominion, accidentally creating the Dor, from which Seons and Skaze have emerged. On Roshar, Odium splintered Honor and brought about the Everstorm and the True Desolation. He has also Splintered Ambition, in the Threnody system. A man known as Hoid is seen or mentioned in most Cosmere books. He travels the so-called Shardworlds, using the people of those worlds to further an unknown agenda.

Sanderson's Laws of Magic 

The idea of hard magic and soft magic was popularized by Sanderson for world building and creating magic systems in fictional settings. The terminology of hard and soft originate from hard and soft sciences, which lends itself towards hard science fiction and soft science fiction. Both terms are approximate ways of characterizing two ends of a spectrum. Hard magic systems follow specific rules, the magic is controlled and explained to the reader in the narrative detailing the mechanics behind the way the magic 'works' and can be used for building settings that revolve around the magic system. Soft magic systems may not have clearly defined rules or limitations, or they may provide limited exposition regarding their workings. They are used to create a sense of wonder to the reader.

Sanderson's three laws of magic are creative writing guidelines that can be used to create magic systems for fantasy stories:
 An author's ability to solve conflict with magic is directly proportional to how well the reader understands said magic.
 Weaknesses, limits and costs are more interesting than powers.
 The author should expand on what is already a part of the magic system before something entirely new is added, as this may otherwise entirely change how the magic system fits into the fictional world.

Additionally, there is a zeroth law: 
   Always err on the side of what's awesome.

Teaching
Sanderson is adjunct faculty at Brigham Young University, teaching a creative writing course once per year. Sanderson also participates in the weekly podcast Writing Excuses with authors Dan Wells, Mary Robinette Kowal, and web cartoonist Howard Tayler. He began hosting the podcast Intentionally Blank with Dan Wells in June 2021, where they discuss random things they enjoy.

Bibliography

Selected awards and honors
Sanderson has been nominated for and also won multiple awards for his various works. See Writing Excuses for additional awards and nominations.

See also 
 Magic (game terminology)
 Magic system

Notes

Explanatory notes

Citations

External links

 
 
 Brandon Sanderson at the MLCA Database
 2020 Creative Writing Lectures at BYU

1975 births
21st-century American male writers
21st-century American novelists
American children's writers
American fantasy writers
American male novelists
American Mormon missionaries in South Korea
American science fiction writers
Brigham Young University alumni
Brigham Young University faculty
Latter Day Saints from Nebraska
Latter Day Saints from Utah
Living people
Novelists from Utah
People from American Fork, Utah
The Wheel of Time
Writers from Lincoln, Nebraska